Ancylosis albifrontella is a species of snout moth in the genus Ancylosis. It was described by Jan Asselbergs in 2010 and is known from the United Arab Emirates.

References

Moths described in 2010
albifrontella
Moths of Asia